Josef Schilhab (12 January 1908 – 11 October 1992) was an Austrian architect. His work was part of the architecture event in the art competition at the 1936 Summer Olympics.

References

1908 births
1992 deaths
20th-century Austrian architects
Olympic competitors in art competitions
People from Schwechat